Ho Peng Kee (born 9 May 1954) is a Singaporean legal academic and former politician. A member of the governing People's Action Party (PAP), he was the Senior Minister of State in the Ministry of Law and the Ministry of Home Affairs, and a Member of Parliament representing the Nee Soon East Single Member Constituency. He announced his retirement from politics on 31 March 2011, prior to the 2011 Singapore general election.

Ho was formerly an academic, and at one time the Vice-Dean of the Faculty of Law at the National University of Singapore (NUS). His academic research interests have included alternative methods of dispute settlement, consumer law and protection, the law of contract, and law and society. He retains the title of Associate Professor as he is on long-term secondment from NUS.

Ho had his early education at Anglo-Chinese School and National Junior College, before going on to earn a Bachelor of Laws (LLB) from the National University of Singapore, and a Master of Laws (LLM) from Harvard Law School. He is called to the Bar as an advocate and solicitor of the Supreme Court of Singapore.

He also serves actively as an elder at Mount Carmel Bible-Presbyterian Church.

Previous positions
 Member of Parliament for the Sembawang Group Representation Constituency (1991–2001).
 Vice-Dean of the Faculty of Law, National University of Singapore.

Notes

External links

Profile at Parliament of Singapore website
Ministry of Home Affairs profile of leaders.

Members of the Parliament of Singapore
People's Action Party politicians
Academic staff of the National University of Singapore Faculty of Law
Harvard Law School alumni
National University of Singapore alumni
National Junior College alumni
Anglo-Chinese School alumni
Singaporean people of Cantonese descent
Singaporean Presbyterians
Living people
1954 births